Amphidromus rottiensis is a species of air-breathing land snail, a terrestrial pulmonate gastropod mollusc in the family Camaenidae. 

Information about this species was published in 2008 and the nomen nudum was validated in 2010. The species was first identified near Rote Island.

References

External links 

rottiensis
Gastropods described in 2010